Mind Medicine Inc., also known as MindMed, is a New York-based psychedelic medicine biotech company that develops psychedelic-inspired medicines known as psychoplastogens and therapies to address addiction and mental illness.

History 
MindMed was founded in May 2019 by Jamon A. Rahn, an entrepreneur, Y-Combinator alumnus, and former Uber executive, and Stephen Hurst, a 35-year veteran of the pharmaceutical industry. Rahn, who was interested in the Silicon Valley trend of psychedelic microdosing to improve focus after struggling with his own mental health and addiction issues, spent two years researching the therapeutic potential of psychedelics prior to meeting Hurst.

MindMed initially focused on developing treatments for opioid withdrawal and opioid use disorder with 18-MC, a non-hallucinogenic molecule based on the psychedelic substance Ibogaine. In June 2019 it acquired the 18-MC drug development program, previously funded by the National Institute on Drug Abuse, and in September began to prepare 18-MC for a Phase I FDA clinical trial to enable further clinical trials targeting opioid withdrawal and opioid use disorder. Psychopharmacologist Stanley Glick, who first synthesized 18-MC with chemist Martin E. Kuehne, was later named to MindMed's board of directors and appointed chair of its scientific advisory board.

MindMed was the first psychedelic pharmaceutical company to go public, listing on the Canadian NEO Exchange under the symbol "MMED" and trading OTCQB as MMEDF. It began trading on NASDAQ as MNMD in April 2021.

Liechti Lab at University Hospital Basel; Maastricht University; NYU Langone
In March 2020, MindMed announced that it had partnered with NYU Langone to launch a clinical training program to train psychiatrists in psychedelic therapies and research to advance and deploy psychedelic medicines. The company committed $5 million to establish the center, which will also explore 18-MC and the use of drugs including psilocybin-assisted therapy for alcohol use disorder.

In April 2020 the company entered into a long-term partnership with University Hospital Basel's Liechti Lab, gaining rights to more than ten years of the lab's data related to LSD, MDMA, and other psychedelic substances. The development of a novel compound designed to shorten the duration or stop an LSD experience that would allow LSD to be more widely used in a therapeutic environment, was subsequently announced. Later that year, a clinical trial studying the effects of DMT, the primary psychoactive ingredient in Ayahuasca, and clinical trials combining MDMA and LSD were announced.  A study to better understand and compare the altered states of consciousness induced by psilocybin and LSD began in August 2020,
and in October, a Phase 1 study at the Liechti Lab on the acute dose dependent effects of LSD was completed. The results of the study were published by the American College of Neuropsychopharmacology in the journal Neuropsychopharmacology. In September 2021, further results were presented by Dr. Matthias Liechti, head of the Liechti Lab, at the INSIGHT Conference in Berlin. The results included the first clinical evidence on the comparative effects of LSD and psilocybin, stating 100mcg of LSD produced the same acute perceptual effects as a dose of 20 mg of psilocybin in healthy volunteers. Additionally, psilocybin taken after administering antidepressants for two weeks prior, was deemed safe, as well as reduced anxiety and blood pressure without hindering the psychedelic experience.

In December 2020, MindMed entered into an investigator-sponsored study agreement with Maastricht University in the Netherlands. The university provided facilities and personnel for a Phase 1 study to evaluate the effects of two low doses of LSD on mood, sleep and neuroplasticity.

Ongoing clinical trials
Project Lucy: Therapist-led experiential therapy incorporating microdoses of LSD to lessen anxiety.

Project Layla: A study concluding that a Phase 1 clinical trial of multiple ascending doses and single ascending doses of 18-MC in healthy subjects was safe at the doses tested. It was subsequently announced that  pending review of the data from the first round of tests, it would initiate a Phase 2a proof of concept that would escalate the dosage of 18-MC.

References

External links
  mindmed.co 

Companies established in 2019